Line 2: Praia Formosa ↔ Praça XV is one of the lines of VLT Carioca, being opened on 6 February 2017.

It has 10 stops in operation, all at-grade. Besides that, another one is in planning. Stops Praia Formosa, Rodoviária, Central and Praça XV have connection with other transport modals.

The system, operated by Concessionária do VLT Carioca S.A., still don't have the balance of the passengers' movement since the beginning of the operation. It attends the districts of Centro and Santo Cristo.

Stations
 Stations under construction or in project

Praia Formosa → Praça XV

Praça XV → Praia Formosa

References

Railway lines opened in 2016
Tram transport in Brazil